was a Japanese general who fought in World War II.

Katakura was a prominent member of the Tōsei-ha faction and as a consequence was a target of the Kōdō-ha faction in the 26 February Incident in 1936, and indeed sustained a head wound at the time.

He was on the staff of the Burma Area Army. He was chief of staff of the Thirty-third Army from 8 April 1944 to 19 June 1944. He was commander of the 202nd Division.

Later life
Katakura resigned in December 1945.

In 1989 he appeared as himself (Kwantung Army Officer, 1931) in The Road to War, a television documentary miniseries, narrated by Charles Wheeler.

Katakura died in 1991.

References

1898 births
1991 deaths
Japanese generals
Japanese military personnel of World War II